Borrell I (Spanish: Borrell I de Pallars) was the sovereign Count of Pallars in 948–995.

Life 
Count Borrell was a son of the Count Lope I of Pallars and Goltregoda of Cerdanya.

Until at least 953, he was a minor under the regency of his mother. Borrell ruled Pallars together with his brothers, Raymond II of Pallars and Suñer I.

He was married to Lady Ermentruda.

 Issue
Ermengol I of Pallars
Isarn (Ysarn)
Miró
William
Ermengarda
Ava

Notes

Counts of Pallars
10th-century Catalan people